Noé Germán Camacho is a Mexican professional racing cyclist.

Career highlights

 2008: 1º in Krem's New Year Cycling Classic (BIZ)

See also
Glossary of cycling
Outline of cycling

References

External links

Mexican male cyclists
Living people
Year of birth missing (living people)
Place of birth missing (living people)
21st-century Mexican people